The Edward T. Breathitt Pennyrile Parkway was the designation for the  controlled-access highway from Henderson to Hopkinsville, Kentucky. The parkway originally began at an interchange with the Audubon Parkway and US 41 near the city of Henderson. It travelled south through rolling hills to its former southern terminus at Interstate 24 (I-24) south of Hopkinsville.  A  section was left unconstructed from US 41 Alternate south to I-24 despite its approval in 1976 from the Parkway Authority for construction. This connection was completed and opened to the public on March 1, 2011.  The first  of the extension to the US 68 bypass (exit 6) were completed and opened to traffic in September 2008. The construction was then completed to exit 5, with the final section to I-24 opened on March 1, 2011. The parkway's northern terminus was truncated south to the Western Kentucky Parkway in 2013 when Interstate 69 was extended along that section of the highway. The remaining section of the Parkway (from I-69 to I-24) was redesignated as Interstate 169 on May 7, 2017, thereby replacing the last section of the Pennyrile Parkway. Despite the designation changes, it  continues to be referred to as the Pennyrile Parkway by most in the area.

The next phase of the extension—now completed—encompassed the portion of the parkway between US 41 Alternate and I-24. As of May 2010, the Lover's Lane interchange (exit 5) opened to local traffic via US 68 ramp (exit 5). The final segment, from US 68 to I-24, opened on March 1, 2011.

It was one of nine highways that are part of Kentucky's parkway system.  The section between the Wendell H. Ford Western Kentucky Parkway near Mortons Gap and the northern terminus in Henderson became part of I-69 with the passage of federal legislation on June 6, 2008. The length of the road carried the unsigned designation Kentucky Route 9004 (EB 9004).

The road was named after Edward T. Breathitt, a former Kentucky governor. Originally called the Pennyrile Parkway from its opening in October 1969 at a cost of $69.2 million, it was renamed for Breathitt in 2000.

The parkway passed through the cities of Madisonville, Sebree, Mortons Gap, Slaughters, and Earlington. It intersected with the Wendell H. Ford Western Kentucky Parkway near Madisonville.

History

As a toll road
The Pennyrile Parkway, as with all nine parkways, was originally a toll road. By Kentucky state law, toll collection ceases when enough toll has been collected or funds received from other sources, such as a legislative appropriation, to pay off the construction bonds for the parkway. In the case of the Pennyrile, toll booths were removed in 1992 when bonds were paid off ten years ahead of schedule.

A section near the middle of the parkway, in the Madisonville area, during much of the parkway’s path through Hopkins County, was free from tolls from the road's opening; this section was also signed as US 41. The US 41 designation has since been removed and applied to the former US 41A through Madisonville and other nearby cities; this road was the original US 41 before the parkway opened. This redesignation followed a horrendous blizzard on January 17, 1994, which forced the then-Kentucky governor Brereton C. Jones to close all Interstates and limited access highways in the state. Heavy trucks were forced to take US 41A through downtown Madisonville for a week, snarling local traffic. The parkway between exits 7 and 9 was also toll free.

Upgrades and re-designations
In 2008, funding was established for the extension of Interstate 69 through Kentucky as a part of a larger nationwide project to extend the Interstate to Laredo, Texas. The KYTC designated portions of the Pennyrile and Western Kentucky Parkways, and all of the Purchase Parkway to be integrated into the Interstate System. Work began almost immediately to upgrade deficiencies in the parkways to full Interstate Standards, such as upgrading bridge railing, converting several interchanges into conventional diamond interchanges, and reconstructing the interchange between the Pennyrile and Western Kentucky parkways to allow for free-flowing traffic on I-69. This work was completed on the Pennyrile stretch, exits were renumbered to match I-69's statewide mileage, and I-69 signs finally went up in 2013. In 2017, the remainder of the parkway was redesignated as Interstate 169.

Exit list

References

External links

 KentuckyRoads.com — Edward T. Breathitt Pennyrile Parkway
 Exit Guide for Edward T. Breathitt Pennyrile Parkway

9004
Interstate 69
Kentucky parkway system